Sihyaj Chan Kʼawiil I, (fl. c. 307) was ajaw ("lord") of the Maya city-state of Tikal. He was son of his predecessor Animal Headdress and Lady Skull. The monument associated with Sihyaj Chan Kʼawiil I is El Encanto Stela I.

Notes

Footnotes

References

Rulers of Tikal
4th century in the Maya civilization
4th-century monarchs in North America
4th-century deaths